Giani Esposito (23 August 1930 – 1 January 1974) was a French film actor and singer-songwriter.

Esposito was born from the union of a French mother with an Italian father in Etterbeek (Belgium), and he died from viral hepatitis in Neuilly-sur-Seine, France. He appeared in 50 films between 1951 and 1973.

As singer-songwriter, between 1958 and 1973, he recorded numerous albums marked with spirituality and poetry. His biggest success is The Clowns (Les Clowns, 1957), several covers by Raymond Devos, Jeanne-Marie Sens, Hervé Vilard and Bernard Lavilliers.

He was married with the French actress Pascale Petit and they had a girl, Doushka Esposito (born in 1963), today singer, and younger, under the name of Douchka, she was ambassadress of Walt Disney's productions on the French television.

Partial filmography

 Maître après Dieu (1951) – Un passager juif (uncredited)
 My Wife Is Formidable (1951) – Le barman de l'hôtel (uncredited)
 Leathernose (1952) – Un jeune invité
 Agence matrimoniale (1952) – (uncredited)
 My Husband Is Marvelous (1952) – Un journaliste
 A Hundred Francs a Second (1953) – Un cheminot en grève (uncredited)
 La môme vert-de-gris (1953) – Le capitaine du bateau
 Quay of Blondes (1954) – Un tueur
 The Women Couldn't Care Less (1954) – Man at the Poker Game (uncredited)
 Cadet Rousselle (1954) – Monseigneur
 Huis clos (1954) – Diego – le disciple de Garcin
 French Cancan (1955) – Prince Alexandre
 Black Dossier (1955) – Jean de Montesson
 Les mauvaises rencontres (1955) – Pierre Jaeger
 Les Hussards (1955) – Pietro
 Cela s'appelle l'aurore (1956) – Sandro Galli
 Pardonnez nos offenses (1956) – Vani
 Reproduction interdite (1957) – Claude Watroff
 Les Misérables (1958) – Marius Pontmercy
 Le bel âge (1960) – Claude
 Normandie – Niémen (1960) – Lemaître
  (1960) – Jérôme
 Paris Belongs to Us (1961) – Gerard Lenz
 Cross of the Living (1962) – Yan
 Anatomy of a Marriage: My Days with Jean-Marc (1964) – Ettore
 Anatomy of a Marriage: My Days with Françoise (1964) – Ettore
 The Sea Pirate (1966) – Napoléon
 Il grande colpo di Surcouf (1966) – Napoléon
 The Decameron (1971)

Discography
 Les Clowns (1959)
 Jardiniers qui doutez de l'arbre de vie (1967)
 Un noble rossignol à l'époque Ming (1968)
 Les ombres sont chinoises (1970)
 Paris, le désert (1972)

References

External links
 

1930 births
1974 deaths
Deaths from hepatitis
French male film actors
French  male singer-songwriters
20th-century French male actors
20th-century French  male singers